This is a list of Allied ships sunk by Axis warships operating in Australian waters during the Second World War.

Fifty four Axis surface raiders and submarines (both German and Japanese) carried out these attacks, sinking 53 merchant ships and three warships within the Australia Station, resulting in the deaths of over 1,751 Allied military personnel, sailors and civilians. A further 88 civilians were killed in air raids.

The definition of "Australian waters" used in this list is the area designated the Australia Station prior to the outbreak of war. This vast area consisted of the waters around Australia and eastern New Guinea, and stretching south to Antarctica. From east to west, it stretched from 170° east in the Pacific Ocean to 80° east in the Indian Ocean, and from north to south it stretched from the Equator to the Antarctic.

A full account is given in Axis naval activity in Australian waters

Ships sunk by surface raiders

The six German and three Japanese surface raiders that operated within Australian waters sank 18 ships and killed over 826 sailors.

Ships sunk by submarines
The following table has been adapted from Appendix V of A Critical Vulnerability: The impact of the submarine threat on Australia's maritime defence 1915 - 1954 by David Stevens. Stevens' appendix lists all known Axis submarine activity in Australian waters during World War II and includes data on unsuccessful submarine attacks on Allied shipping, attacks made in Papuan and Netherlands East Indies waters and Japanese patrols in Australian waters which did not result in any attacks on Allied ships.

See also
Axis naval activity in Australian waters
Axis naval activity in New Zealand waters
List of Allied ships lost to Italian surface vessels in the Mediterranean (1940-43)
List of Royal Australian Navy losses

Notes

Battle Surface: Japan's Submarine War Against Australia 1942-44 by David Jenkins (1992, Random House, NSW Australia) 

Ships sunk by Axis warships in Australian waters
Sunk by Axis warships in Australian waters